Lara Custance (born 20 November 1992) is a New Zealand actress who appeared as Abi in the TV series Paradise Café. She is best known for her role as Harmony in The Tribe 'sister' series The New Tomorrow in which she acted alongside her brother Rafe Custance. She attended Chilton St James School but took time off school to film for Paradise Cafe, which is currently broadcast in the UK on BBC and New Zealand television channels. She now attends the University of Auckland where she is studying a BA/BCom conjoint degree.

References

External link
 Lara Custance at IMDb

1992 births
New Zealand television actresses
Living people
People educated at Chilton Saint James School